In algebra, the continuant is a multivariate polynomial representing the determinant of a tridiagonal matrix and having applications in generalized continued fractions.

Definition
The n-th continuant  is defined recursively by

Properties
The continuant  can be computed by taking the sum of all possible products of x1,...,xn, in which any number of disjoint pairs of consecutive terms are deleted (Euler's rule). For example,
 
It follows that continuants are invariant with respect to reversing the order of indeterminates: 

The continuant can be computed as the determinant of a tridiagonal matrix:
 

 , the (n+1)-st Fibonacci number.
 
 Ratios of continuants represent (convergents to) continued fractions as follows:
 
 The following matrix identity holds:
 .
For determinants, it implies that

and also

Generalizations
A generalized definition takes the continuant with respect to three sequences a, b and c, so that K(n) is a polynomial of a1,...,an, b1,...,bn−1 and c1,...,cn−1.  In this case the recurrence relation becomes

 

Since br and cr enter into K only as a product brcr there is no loss of generality in assuming that the br are all equal to 1.

The generalized continuant is precisely the determinant of the tridiagonal matrix

In Muir's book the generalized continuant is simply called continuant.

References
 
 
 

Continued fractions
Matrices
Polynomials